South Bunbury Football Club is a semi-professional Australian rules football club based in South Bunbury, Western Australia. The club plays in the South West Football League. Since being founded in 1897 the club has won 45 premierships and has been a runner-up 24 times. Since joining the SWFL in 1957 they have won 15 premierships.

History
The South Bunbury club was founded in May 1897 at a meeting at the Prince of Wales Hotel in Bunbury.

South Bunbury picked up the nickname Tigers after the relative inaccessibility and perceived wildness of the South Bunbury area around the turn of the 20th century.

Club records

Total League premierships: 45 (1898, 1899, 1904, 1905, 1906, 1907, 1908, 1912, 1913, 1914, 1918, 1919, 1920, 1921, 1922, 1926, 1929, 1931, 1933, 1934, 1935, 1936, 1937, 1948, 1949, 1951, 1952, 1953, 1954, 1955, 1957, 1959, 1966, 1968, 1971, 1976, 1980, 1981, 1984, 1985, 1988, 1989, 1993, 2002, 2016)
Reserves premierships: 28 (1921, 1922, 1923, 1931, 1933, 1937, 1947, 1950, 1951, 1952, 1953, 1954, 1955, 1956, 1957, 1958, 1959, 1960, 1962, 1965, 1971, 1974, 1984, 1986, 1991, 1993, 2007, 2017, 2022)
Colts premierships: 6 (1964, 1983, 1984, 1986, 1990, 2005)
   Womens premierships : 3 (2019,2020,2021)
Most career games: 277, Ian Cahill
Most goals in a game: 14, Adam Matson, 2000
Most goals in a season: 87 Don Aldersea, 1967

Notable players 

Syd Jackson
Adam Hunter
Alan Cransberg
Trevor Nisbett
Phillip Matson
Leon Baker
Michael Warren
David Hollins
Darren Kowal

References

Australian rules football clubs established in 1897
Australian rules football clubs in Western Australia
South West Football League clubs
1897 establishments in Australia
Sport in Bunbury, Western Australia